Potassa is a village in Tuscany, central Italy, administratively a frazione of the comune of Gavorrano, province of Grosseto. At the time of the 2001 census its population amounted to 160.

Geography 
Potassa is about 30 km from Grosseto and 7 km from Gavorrano, and it is situated in a plain at the foot of the hills of Monte Calvo and Poggio Moscatello, down the ravine Sovata.

History 
Potassa was born in the 19th century as an industrial centre related to the mines of Gavorrano. Its name comes from potassium carbonate (potassa in Italian).

Transportation 
The village is positioned along the Via Aurelia highway and easily reached from the Tirrenica railway line thanks to its own station, as the main railway station of the comune — for this reason, Potassa is also known as Gavorrano Scalo ("scalo" means "station").

References 

Frazioni of Gavorrano
Railway towns in Italy